USS Osceola has been the name of more than one United States Navy ship, and may refer to:

 , a gunboat in commission from 1864 to 1865
 USS Osceola, a monitor which carried that name from 1869 to 1873 and had been named  from 1863 to 1869 and USS Vixen briefly in 1869.
 , an armed seagoing tug in commission in 1898 (seeing combat in the Spanish–American War) and from 1911 to 1922
 , later YTB-129, later YTM-129, a harbor tug commissioned in 1938 and sold for scrapping in 1973

United States Navy ship names